Ashton-under-Lyne is a constituency in the House of Commons of the UK Parliament. It has been represented since 2015 by Angela Rayner, who has served as Deputy Leader of the Labour Party since 2020.

Constituency profile
Like much of Greater Manchester, Ashton was a significant hub for textile production and retains some manufacturing. Incomes and house prices are lower than UK averages.

Boundaries 

The constituency covers the Failsworth East, Failsworth West wards in the Metropolitan Borough of Oldham and the Ashton Hurst, Ashton St. Michael's, Ashton Waterloo, Droylsden East, Droylsden West and St. Peters wards of the Metropolitan Borough of Tameside.

1832–1885: The area defined by the Ashton-under-Lyne Improvement Act 1827 (7 & 8 Geo. IV. c.lxxvii).

1885–1918: The existing parliamentary borough, and so much of the parish of Ashton-under-Lyne included in the local government district of Hurst as was not already included in the parliamentary borough.

1918–1949: The Municipal Borough of Ashton-under-Lyne, and the Urban District of Hurst.

1950–1955: The Municipal Boroughs of Ashton-under-Lyne, and Mossley; and the Rural District of Limehurst.

1955–1983: The Municipal Boroughs of Ashton-under-Lyne, and Mossley; and the Rural District of Droylsden.

Members of Parliament 

In the 1886 election, voting resulted in a tie between incumbent John Edmund Wentworth Addison and the Liberal candidate. Under the legislation of the time, the presiding officer had a casting vote, and Addison was reelected.
In the by-election of 29 October 1928, the turnout was 89.1%, a record for Great Britain. The mayor arranged for the result to be signalled by coloured rockets.

Elections

Elections in the 2010s 

UKIP originally selected Angela McManus as candidate, but she changed to the Stalybridge and Hyde constituency.

Back to Elections

Elections in the 2000s 

Back to Elections

Elections in the 1990s 

Back to Elections

Elections in the 1980s 

Back to Elections

Elections in the 1970s 

Back to Elections

Elections in the 1960s

Back to Elections

Elections in the 1950s

Back to Elections

Elections in the 1940s

Back to Elections

Elections in the 1930s
William Jowitt won the 1939 Ashton-under-Lyne by-election unopposed.

Back to Elections

Elections in the 1920s

Back to Elections

Elections in the 1910s

1916 Ashton-under-Lyne by-election
In the Ashton-under-Lyne By-Election of 23 December 1916, Albert Henry Stanley, Unionist was elected unopposed.

Back to Elections

Elections in the 1900s

Back to Elections

Elections in the 1890s

Back to Elections

Elections in the 1880s

* Both candidates having received 3,049 votes each, Addison was elected on the Returning Officer's casting vote.

Back to Elections

Elections in the 1870s 

Back to Elections

Elections in the 1860s 

Back to Elections

Elections in the 1850s

 Caused by Gibson's appointment as President of the Board of Trade

 Caused by Gibson's appointment as President of the Poor Law Board.

 Caused by Hindley's death.

Back to Elections

Elections in the 1840s

Back to Top

Elections in the 1830s

Back to Top

See also 
 List of parliamentary constituencies in Greater Manchester
 1920 Ashton-under-Lyne by-election
 1928 Ashton-under-Lyne by-election
 1931 Ashton-under-Lyne by-election
 1939 Ashton-under-Lyne by-election
 1945 Ashton-under-Lyne by-election

Notes

References

Sources 
Election results 1992–2005
Election results 1951–1992

Parliamentary constituencies in Greater Manchester
Constituencies of the Parliament of the United Kingdom established in 1832
Politics of the Metropolitan Borough of Oldham
Politics of Tameside